Tuxpan Municipality (or Túxpam Municipality, fully Túxpam de Rodríguez Cano Municipality) is a municipality located in the Mexican state of Veracruz.  

The capital is Túxpam de Rodríguez Cano.

Demographics
The population of the municipality was 134,394 inhabitants, according to the INEGI census of 2005, residing in a total area of 1,051.89 km² (406.14 sq mi).

Geography
The municipality covers an area of 1,061.90 km².

Subdivisions
The municipality includes many smaller outlying communities, the largest of which are Alto Lucero and Santiago de la Peña. A local beachside community is also nearby.

 43 congregaciones.
 41 rancherías 
 1 poblado.

Borders 
 N: Tamiahua Municipality
 S:  Cazones Municipality
 E: Gulf of Mexico
 W: Álamo-Temapache Municipality and Tihuatlán Municipality

Municipalities of Veracruz